The white-spotted puffer fish (Arothron hispidus) is a medium to large-sized puffer fish, it can reach 50 cm length. It is light grey in color, or greyish or yellowish, and clearly covered with more or less regular white points, that become concentric contrasting white and dark grey lines that radiate around the eyes and pectoral fins. The ventral part is white. The "shoulder" (around the pectoral fins) is dark. It also has concentric contrasting white and dark grey lines that radiate around the eyes and pectoral fins. The white spotted puffer fish is poisonous.

Its distribution extends through the Indo-Pacific area, Red Sea included, to the eastern Pacific Ocean. A confirmed record was reported recently from the eastern Mediterranean Sea off Cyprus. It can be found at depths of three to 35 metres. Its habitat types include reefs, lagoons, estuaries, and tidepools. Its diet includes calcareous or coralline algae, molluscs, tunicates, sponges, corals, zoanthids, crabs, polychaetes, starfish, urchins, krill, and silversides.

The adult is nocturnal and solitary. It is territorial, becoming somewhat aggressive.

References

External links
 

Arothron
Fish described in 1758
Taxa named by Carl Linnaeus
Fish of Hawaii
Fish of Japan